Cheung Lai-chuen was a Chinese martial artist. He was born in 1882 during the Qing dynasty. He was a student of many great Kung Fu masters and mastered the Lei Ga (李家, Lee Style), Southern Dragon Kung Fu, Lau Man Gaau (流民教, Vagabond or Wanderer's Style), and Bak Mei (White Eyebrow Style).  He was responsible for codifying the latter.

He began his study of the martial arts at the age of 7 with the traditional Chinese medicine practitioner Sek Lam, who taught him the vagrant style. Jeung would later learn Li Style from Li Mung, (founded by Li Yi, 李義) who taught Jeung his family style. While he was studying martial arts with the Lam family, he became close friends with their son Lam Yiu-gwai, with whom he had much in common, and eventually studied under Yiu Gwai's uncle. Lam would later become known for disseminating Dragon Kung Fu much as Jeung would later become known for disseminating Bak Mei. Both were born in Huiyang District in Huizhou, Guangdong province. and a marriage between their families would eventually make them cousins. They both left Huizhou to build their futures in Guangzhou and did so by opening several schools together.

After moving to Guangzhou, Jeung was defeated by the monk Lin Sang. The monk then referred Jeung to his own teacher Juk Faat-wan, who taught Jeung the art of Bak Mei over the next two or three years. Jeung had a background in the martial arts of the Hakka people, from his study of Li Mung's family style and the vagrant style. Because of this, Jeung's style of Bak Mei is associated  the dragon style of Lam Yiu-gwai due to the many years Jeung and Lam spent training together.

References

1882 births
1964 deaths
Chinese martial artists
Sportspeople from Guangdong
People from Huiyang